Mineral Center is an unincorporated community in Cook County, Minnesota, United States; located five miles west of the community of Grand Portage.

The community is located at the intersection of Cook County Road 89 and Cook County Road 17 (Mineral Center Road).

Mineral Center is located within the Grand Portage Indian Reservation.

Education
All of the county is zoned to Cook County ISD 166.

References

 Minnesota DOT map of Cook County (2011)

Unincorporated communities in Cook County, Minnesota
Unincorporated communities in Minnesota
Minnesota populated places on Lake Superior